Muhammad Ali vs. Floyd Patterson refers to two heavyweight professional boxing matches between Muhammad Ali and Floyd Patterson. The first match took place on November 22, 1965 for the WBC/Ring/lineal world heavyweight championship; and the second on September 20, 1972, for the regional  North American Boxing Federation (NABF) heavyweight title. Ali won both fights through technical knockouts. The first fight was stopped in the 12th round; and the second after the 7th round.  

Patterson had previously lost his heavyweight title to Sonny Liston in a 1st round knockout.  In a later rematch, Patterson lost again in the 1st round. Liston later lost the title to Ali.  Meanwhile, Patterson won bouts against Eddie Machen and George Chuvalo. Patterson was now the number-one challenger for the title held by Ali. 

On November 22, 1965, Patterson fought Ali for the first time. Patterson lost by technical knockout at the end of the 12th round, going into the fight with an optimistic view. Instead of scoring a quick knockout, Ali mocked, humiliated and punished Patterson throughout, before the referee stopped the fight in the 12th round. A New York Times reporter complained that the fight was like watching someone "pulling the wings off a butterfly."

On September 20, 1972, Patterson fought Ali for the second time.  At age 37, Patterson was stopped in the 7th round. The defeat proved to be Patterson's last fight, although there was never an announcement of retirement.

References

Patterson
World Boxing Council heavyweight championship matches
1965 in boxing
1972 in boxing
November 1965 sports events
September 1972 sports events